is a Japanese professional volleyball player from Okazaki City, Aichi, Prefecture. She's a member of the Japan Women's National Volleyball Team, as one of its outside hitters. She competed at the 2020 Summer Olympics, in Women's volleyball.

She currently plays for the club Toray Arrows. She used to be the captain of Japan U-18 and U-20 national volleyball team.

Personal life
Ishikawa has one older sister and one older brother, Yūki Ishikawa, who is a member of Japan men's national volleyball team. She was motivated by her siblings to start playing volleyball and her brother would always give good advice about spiking when she was in high school.

Career 
She started playing volleyball when she was in the third year of Yahagi Minami Elementary School, in Okazaki city, and joined the local club team Anjo Kita Rabbits.

In 2013, she attended Nagano City Susobana Junior High School, which is known as a strong team. In junior high school, she participated in the "National Junior High School Athletic Meet" for three consecutive years, winning twice in 2013 (1st year) and 2015 (3rd year).

After graduating from junior high school in 2016, she entered Shimokitazawa Seitoku High School, which has a prestigious high school volleyball team. She had become a regular player since the first year and won the "2016 The National High School Comprehensive Athletic Meet Volleyball Tournament" (Inter-high) by defeating Kinrankai High School with a set count of 3-0. In 2017, she became the ace of the team and at the "69th All Japan Volleyball High School Championship" (Harutaka), she led the team and defeated Shujitsu High School with a straight set in the final round.

In March 2017, Mayu was first registered as a member of Japan women's national under-18 volleyball team and competed as national team representative for the first time at 2017 Asian Girls' U18 Volleyball Championship in China. She served as the captain and Japan team won the title.

In the third year of high school in 2018, she became captain of the team. In the same year, at the "2018 The National High School Comprehensive Athletic Meet Volleyball Tournament" (Inter-high), she defeated 3-0 in the final with Kinrankai High School and achieved the third tournament victory for the first time in two years. At the "73rd National Sports Festival Volleyball Competition" (Kokutai) in the fall, as the representative of Tokyo, her school had defeated Kinrankai High School with a set count of 3-1. The victory made Shimokitazawa Seitoku High School achieve two consecutive high school crowns. In January 2019, the team challenged the triple crown in the "71st All Japan Volleyball High School Championships" (Harutaka), Shimokitazawa Seitoku High School lost to Higashi Kyushu Ryutani High School with a full set in the semi-finals round.

January 16, 2019, Toray Arrows of the V.League Division 1 announced that Mayu would join the team as an informal player. She debuted in 2018/19 season, in the final 8 round, in the match against Hisamitsu Springs in the starting lineup.

In July 2019, at 2019 FIVB Volleyball Women's U20 World Championship in Mexico, Mayu served as the captain of the under-20 national team. Mayu led the team to victory and received the “Most Valuable Player” (MVP) and 2nd “Best Outside Spiker” awards.

In the August of the same year, Japan won the gold medal at the 2019 Asian Women's Volleyball Championship and Mayu received the same awards at the end of the competition. Her success was evaluated by Kumi Nakada, the director of the Japan senior national team, so she became a member of the 2019 FIVB Volleyball Women's World Cup Japanese roster. In the tournament, she was appointed as a starting member in the matches against United States and South Korea, and was the best Japanese scorer in both games.

In 2021 she took part in the 2021 FIVB Volleyball Women's Nations League. Mayu was also part of the Japanese women's roster for the 2020 Summer Olympics.

Clubs
  Shimokitazawa Seitoku High School (2016-2019)
  Toray Arrows (2019–present)

Awards

Individual
 2018-2019 All Japan High School Championship - Best Outside Spiker 
 2019 FIVB Volleyball Women's U20 World Championship - Best Outside Spiker 
 2019 FIVB Volleyball Women's U20 World Championship - Most Valuable Player 
 2019 Asian Women's Volleyball Championship - Most Valuable Player 
 2019 Asian Women's Volleyball Championship - Best Outside Spiker

High school team
 2016-17 All Japan High School Championship-  - Champion, with Shimokitazawa Seitoku
 2017-18 All Japan High School Championship-  - Bronze medal, with Shimokitazawa Seitoku

Club team
 2018–19 V.League Division 1 Women's -  - Runner-up, with Toray Arrows
 2018-19 Kurowashiki Tournament -  - Champion, with Toray Arrows
 2020–21 V.League Division 1 Women's -  - Runner-up, with Toray Arrows
 2020-21 Japanese Empress' Cup -  - Runner-up, with Toray Arrows

National team
 2017 Asian Girls' U18 Volleyball Championship -  - Champion
 2019 FIVB Volleyball Women's U20 World Championship -  - Champion
 2019 Asian Women's Volleyball Championship -  - Champion

References

External links
 Profile Player - Japan - FIVB Volleyball Women's U20 World Championship 2019 at FIVB.org
 中国＆韓国撃破の立役者・石川真佑にVNL公式サイトが注目！「高みを目指すため欠かせない存在だ」【女子バレー】 at yahoo.co.jp
 石川真佑と黒後愛。女子バレーの若きエースが攻守両面で見せる進化 at sportiva.shueisha.co.jp
 優勝は逃したが…東レ女子“21連勝の立役者”石川真佑20歳の「頼もしい」成長ぶり　2つの課題を克服できたワケ at number.bunshun.jp
 東レアローズ石川真佑選手のタテヨココネクション at getsuvolley.com
 Player focus: Mayu Ishikawa -Japan's top scorer in their victory against China on Wednesday at volleyballworld.com
 Mayu Ishikawa's Japanese Wikipedia
 Volleyball-Brother can wait as Japan's Mayu Ishikawa focuses on Games at reuters.com

2000 births
Living people
Japanese women's volleyball players
Japan women's international volleyball players
Volleyball players at the 2020 Summer Olympics
Olympic volleyball players of Japan
People from Okazaki, Aichi